Raising Expectations (formerly known as The Wonderful Wayneys) is a Canadian television series, produced by Aircraft Pictures in conjunction with Dolphin Entertainment. The series stars Jason Priestley and Molly Ringwald as Wayne and Paige Wayney, the perfectionist parents of five teenage children of whom four are perennial overachievers, and Simon Cadel as Emmett, the one son who is constantly falling short of his parents' demanding expectations. The cast also includes Luke Bilyk, Katie Douglas, Jake Sim and Matthew Tissi. The series premiered on May 8, 2016 on Family Channel. Season 2 began airing in mid-2017.

Cast
 Jason Priestley as Wayne Wayney
 Molly Ringwald as Paige Wayney
 Luke Bilyk as Adam Wayney
 Matthew Tissi as Bentley Wayney
 Katie Douglas as Conner Wayney
 Jake Sim as Derek Wayney
 Simon Cadel as Emmett Wayney

Episodes

Season 1 (2016)

Special (2016)

Season 2 (2017)

References

External links

2011 American television series debuts
2013 American television series endings
Family Channel (Canadian TV network) original programming
English-language television shows